Burlock Peak is a peak,  high, on the spur descending from Mount Simsarian, along the east face of Watson Escarpment. It was mapped by the United States Geological Survey from surveys and from U.S. Navy air photos, 1960–64, and named by the Advisory Committee on Antarctic Names for James U. Burlock, builder at Byrd Station in 1962.

References
 

Mountains of Marie Byrd Land